This is a list of all 67 grammar schools operating in Northern Ireland.



A

Abbey Christian Brothers Grammar School, Newry, County Down
Antrim Grammar School, Antrim, County Antrim
Aquinas Diocesan Grammar School, Belfast
Assumption Grammar School, Ballynahinch, County Down

B

Ballyclare High School, Ballyclare, County Antrim
Ballymena Academy, Ballymena, County Antrim
Banbridge Academy, Banbridge, County Down
Bangor Grammar School, Bangor, County Down
Belfast High School, Newtownabbey, County Antrim
Belfast Royal Academy, Belfast
Bloomfield Collegiate School, Belfast

C

Cambridge House Grammar School, Ballymena, County Antrim
Campbell College, Belfast
Carrickfergus Grammar School, Carrickfergus, County Antrim
Christian Brothers' Grammar School, Omagh, County Tyrone
Coleraine Grammar School, Coleraine, County Londonderry

D

Dalriada School, Ballymoney, County Antrim
Dominican College, Portstewart, County Londonderry
Dominican College, Fortwilliam, Belfast
Down High School, Downpatrick, County Down

E

Enniskillen Royal Grammar School, Enniskillen, County Fermanagh

F

Foyle College, Derry
Friends' School, Lisburn, County Antrim

G

Glenlola Collegiate School, Bangor, County Down
Grosvenor Grammar School, Belfast

H

Hunterhouse College, Belfast

L
Larne Grammar School, Larne, County Antrim
Limavady Grammar School, Limavady, County Londonderry
Loreto College, Coleraine, County Londonderry
Loreto Grammar School, Omagh, County Tyrone
Lumen Christi College, Derry
Lurgan College, Lurgan, County Armagh

M
Methodist College, Belfast
Mount Lourdes Grammar School, Enniskillen, County Fermanagh

O
Omagh Academy, Omagh, County Tyrone
Our Lady and St Patrick's College, Knock, Belfast
Our Lady's Grammar School, Newry, County Down

P

Portadown College, Portadown, County Armagh

R

Rainey Endowed School, Magherafelt, County Londonderry
Rathmore Grammar School, Belfast
Regent House School, Newtownards, County Down
Royal Belfast Academical Institution, Belfast
Royal School, Armagh, Armagh
Royal School Dungannon, Dungannon, County Tyrone

S
Sacred Heart Grammar School, Newry, County Down
St Colman's College, Newry, County Down
St Columb's College, Derry
St. Dominic's High School, Belfast
St Joseph's Grammar School, Donaghmore, County Tyrone
St Louis Grammar School, Ballymena, Ballymena, County Antrim
St Louis Grammar School, Kilkeel, Kilkeel, County Down
St Malachy's College, Belfast
St Mary's Christian Brothers Grammar School, Belfast
St Mary's Grammar School, Magherafelt, County Londonderry
St Michael's College, Enniskillen, County Fermanagh
St Patrick's Academy, Dungannon, County Tyrone
St Patrick's Grammar School, Armagh
St Patrick's Grammar School, Downpatrick, Downpatrick, County Down
Strabane Academy, Strabane, County Tyrone
Strathearn School, Belfast
Sullivan Upper School, Holywood, County Down

T

 Thornhill College, Derry

V

Victoria College, Belfast

W

Wallace High School, Lisburn, County Antrim
Wellington College Belfast, Belfast

References
Department of Education NI

 
Grammar schools